Thomas Bata may refer to:

 Tomáš Baťa (1876–1932), founder of Bata Shoes
 Thomas J. Bata (1914–2008), Tomáš's son who led the corporation through the 1980s
 Thomas G. Bata (born 1948), Tomáš's grandson who currently leads Bata Shoes

See also
 Tomas Bata University in Zlín, Czech Republic
 Club Deportivo Thomas Bata, Chile